Wuzhi Mountain is the highest mountain in Hainan, China, towering  above the center of Hainan Island. The surrounding areas of Wuzhi Mountain are inhabited mainly by the Li ethnic group. It is located adjacent to Wuzhishan City but is not part of that city's administrative area.

Various Li myths concern the name for the mountain (Five Finger Mountain) and its formation. One legend has it that the five mountain peaks are the fossilized fingers of a dead Li clan chief. Another tale is that the five peaks are dedicated to the five most powerful Li gods. Numerous historical poems have also been written about the mountain, the most famous of all by the Hainan writer, Qiujun.

See also
 List of Ultras of Tibet and East Asia

References

External links

Highest points of Chinese provinces
Mountains of Hainan